Nellie Keeler (April 6, 1875 – 1903) was an American child circus performer known as Little Queen Mab.

Life

Nellie Keeler was born with dwarfism on April 6, 1875, in Kokomo, Indiana. She was the youngest of three daughters and a son raised by Ezra and Maria Keeler. Her father was a farmer and a Civil War veteran, having served with the 4th Indiana Cavalry. Ezra Keeler died in 1917 while in his seventies at a home for disabled war veterans in Marion, Indiana. Maria Keeler lived to be in her late eighties, and died in 1937 in Kokomo.

By the age of three Nellie Keeler came to the attention of P. T. Barnum through local press articles about her diminutive stature. Nellie weighed only eleven pounds and stood just a few inches over two feet. After a successful four-week tryout in 1878 she began touring with Barnum’s circus, along with the company of her father,  as the "sweet girl with radiant golden hair". Barnum placed her on a stage a few feet above the floor in a fashionable blue cashmere costume and short skirt.  Next to her sat Colonel Routh Goshen, a man Barnum claimed stood nearly eight foot tall and weighed over six hundred pounds. Nellie’s contract with Barnum stipulated bad childhood behavior could void her contract and deprive her family of a potential income of a hundred dollars a month.

Nellie’s employment with Barnum came to an end when by the age of twelve she was no longer a tiny little girl. Over her short six-year career Nellie was billed as "a microscopic bud of humanity", "a little elf", "a fairy beauty", a "pocket volume of humanity" and "the Indiana Midget". Nellie's circus income enabled her father to become an independent farmer, free of mortgage. Her obituary, which appeared in the June 18, 1903, issue of the New York Times, stated she died at age twenty-eight from tuberculosis at her residence near Versailles, Indiana, and that she had been in declining health since her teens.

Sources

1875 births
1903 deaths
19th-century American people
19th-century American women
American circus performers
20th-century deaths from tuberculosis
Entertainers with dwarfism
Sideshow performers
19th-century circus performers
Tuberculosis deaths in Indiana